Dr. José Caeiro da Mata  (January 6, 1883 – January 3, 1963) was a Portuguese jurist, professor of law and politician.

Mata began his career in 1907 as a Professor at the University of Coimbra, before transferring to the University of Lisbon in 1919. He held several public and administrative positions in Lisbon and was rector of the University from 1929 to 1946. He was  a deputy judge in the Permanent Court of International Justice from 1931 to 1936. Under the Estado Novo, he served twice as the Minister of Foreign Affairs (1933 – 1935, 1947 – 1950) and the Minister of National Education (1944 – 1947).

Representing Portugal as Foreign Minister, Mata signed the North Atlantic Treaty on April 4, 1949 at Washington, D.C.

Notes

References 

1883 births
1963 deaths